The Wing may refer to:

Wing Luke Museum of the Asian Pacific American Experience
The Wing (workspace), a women's co-working space and social club founded by Audrey Gelman

See also
Wing (disambiguation)